Cedar Township is a township in Wilson County, Kansas, in the United States.

History
Cedar Township was founded in 1867.

References

Townships in Wilson County, Kansas
Townships in Kansas